Stromness is the second largest town on Orkney, Scotland.

Stromness may also refer to:

 Stromness, South Georgia, a whaling station on South Georgia Island, South Atlantic
 Stromness Bay, South Georgia Island
 Stromness, a community in Haldimand County, Ontario, Canada
 RFA Stromness (A344), later USNS Saturn, a 1966 ship of the British Royal Fleet Auxiliary used in the Falklands War
 Stromness, the 2009 debut novel by German artist Herbert Wetterauer

See also
 
 
 Straumsnes (disambiguation)
 Åsmund L. Strømnes, (1927-200, Norwegian teacher